Talkin' Loud was a record label, originally founded by Gilles Peterson in 1990 after he left Acid Jazz Records. The label name is based on Peterson's Dingwalls club night "Talkin' Loud And Sayin' Something", itself a reference to James Brown and Bobby Byrd's "Talkin' Loud and Sayin' Nothing". Norman Jay was its A&R. The label is owned by Phonogram.

The first release from Talkin' Loud was a self-titled compilation in 1990 featuring artists Galliano, Jalal of the Last Poets, Incognito, Young Disciples, Wild & Peaceful, and Ace of Clubs. The label saw five of its artists nominated for the Mercury Music Prize, with Roni Size's Reprazent winning the award in 1997 for the album New Forms. The iconic Talkin' Loud logo was created by Ian Swift (Swifty) who also designed the magazine Straight No Chaser.

Artists

 4 Hero
 Abstract Truth
 Ace Of Clubs
 Ahmen-Rah
 Bryan Powell
 The Cinematic Orchestra
 Cleveland Watkiss
 Courtney Pine
 DJ Krust
 Dwele
 Dynamite MC
 Elisabeth Troy
 Eternal Sun
 Femi Kuti
 Galliano
 Gilles Peterson
 Heliocentric World
 Incognito

 Innerzone Orchestra
 Jazzanova
 Jeffrey Darnell
 Johnny One-Drop
 K-Creative, The
 Krust
 Marxman
 MC Solaar
 MJ Cole
 Native Sol
 Neil Barnes
 Nicolette
 Nuyorican Soul
 Oliver Nelson
 Omar
 Perception
 Peter Thomas

 Raw Deal
 Roni Size / Reprazent
 Shawn Lee
 Skinnyman
 Sons Of Samacand
 Steps Ahead
 Tamba Trio
 Tammy Payne
 Terry Callier
 The Roots
 Tim Dog
 United Future Organization
 Urban Species
 Wax Doctor
 Young Disciples

See also
 List of record labels

References

British record labels
Jazz record labels
Electronic music record labels